The dusky jawfish (Opistognathus whitehursti) is a species of jawfish native to the western Atlantic Ocean including the Gulf of Mexico and the Caribbean Sea where it is an inhabitant of reefs at depths of from .  It can reach a length of  TL.  This species can also be found in the aquarium trade.

Etymology
The specific name honours Dr. D. D. Whitehurst, a collector of specimens for the Smithsonian Institution, one of which was the type specimen of this species.

References

External links
 

dusky jawfish
Fish of the Caribbean
Fish of the Dominican Republic
Taxa named by William Harding Longley
dusky jawfish